State assembly elections were held in Malaysia on 3 August 1986 in all states except Sabah (where they were held on 4 and 5 May 1986) and Sarawak (where they were not held until the following year).

Results

Johor

Kedah

Kelantan

Malacca

Negeri Sembilan

Pahang

Penang

Perak

Perlis

Sabah

Selangor

Terengganu

References

State elections in Malaysia
state